Mahur Sabz-e Neqareh Khaneh (also Romanized as Māhūr Sabz-e Neqāreh Khāneh; also known as Māhūr Sabz and Mor Sabz) is a village in Kabgian Rural District, Kabgian District, Dana County, Kohgiluyeh and Boyer-Ahmad Province, Iran. At the 2006 census, its population was 40, in 9 families.

References 

Populated places in Dana County